Mioawateria rhomboidea is a species of sea snail, a marine gastropod mollusk in the family Raphitomidae.

Description

Distribution
This marine species occurs off West Africa
.

References

 Thiele J. (1925). Gastropoden der Deutschen Tiefsee-Expedition. II Teil. Wissenschaftliche Ergebnisse der Deutschen Tiefsee-Expedition auf dem Dampfer "Valdivia" 1898–1899. 17(2): 35–382, pls 13–46 .

External links
 Morassi, M.; Bonfitto, A. (2013). Three new bathyal raphitomine gastropods (Mollusca: Conoidea) from the Indo-Pacific region. Zootaxa. 3620(4)
 

rhomboidea
Gastropods described in 1925